The Conquerors is a 2013 French adventure comedy film directed by Xabi Molia, with stars Mathieu Demy, Denis Podalydès and Christian Crahay, with the director playing a seventh-billed supporting role.

The film was exhibited in southwest France on 21 June 2013 at the Contis Film Festival (premiere) and, two months later (24 August) at another film festival, in Gindou. The full release in France was on 25 September, but it continued to be seen at festivals (Belgium's Festival International du Film Francophone de Namur on 1 October and Canada's Cinéfest Sudbury International Film Festival on 15 September 2014.

Plot
Half-brothers Noah and Gilead attend their archeologist father's funeral and, after recounting and comparing each other's misfortunes, become convinced that their misery is caused by a curse upon their father and his descendants resulting from the father's theft of the Holy Grail. Their solution is to embark on a quest for the Grail and return it to the location from which it was disturbed and removed by their father.

Cast

 Mathieu Demy as Noah
 Denis Podalydès as Gilead
 Christian Crahay as Del Sarto
 Michel Dubois as Mr. Van der Eecken
 Julie Kapour as Madam Van der Eecken
 Michel Molia as Michel
 Xabi Molia as Hector
 Charlotte Krenz as Maja
 Christelle Cornil as Agnès

 Christine Dargenton as Nurse
 Florence Muller as Doctor
 Yassine Fadel as Morgan
 Eric Chignara: President
 Maxence Brabant as Maxence
 Didier Colfs as President of adverse club
 Marc Bodnar as Philippe
 Régis Royer as Director
 Hugues Hausman as Vigil keeper

 Cédric Zimmerlin as Merchant
 Gautier About as Doctor
 Émilie Scarlett Moget as Eider
 Philippe Oyhamburu as Ramuntxo
 Amélie Glenn as Amane
 Jean-Claude Drouot as Joseph Tadoussac
 Mathieu Busson as Sami
 Alice Pehlivanyan as Pantxika
 Lee Michelsen as Jarle
 Anna-Lena Strasse as Freya

References

External links
 

2013 films
2010s adventure comedy films
French adventure comedy films
2010s French-language films
French comedy road movies
2010s comedy road movies
2013 comedy films
2010s French films